Conotalopia minima is a species of sea snail, a marine gastropod mollusk in the family Trochidae also known as top-snails.

Description
The shell grows to 2 mm.

Distribution
Conotalopia minima is native to the Sea of Japan and the Sea of Okhotsk.

References

 Higo, S., Callomon, P. & Goto, Y. (1999). Catalogue and bibliography of the marine shell-bearing Mollusca of Japan. Osaka. : Elle Scientific Publications. 749 pp.

External links
 To World Register of Marine Species
 

minima
Gastropods described in 1967